The Soviet Ground Forces, successor to the Red Army, the title changing in 1945, employed a wide range of different military formations.

Formations 
 Theatre of Military Operations (TV).  
 Theatre of Military Operations (teatr voennykh deistvii, TVD): Strategic Directions were set up at the beginning and at the end of World War II. During the Second World War, six strategic direction headquarters existed as part of the Stavka:
 Chief command of the troops of the Western Direction (1941–42), replaced by Stavka representative role
 Chief command of the troops of the North Western Direction (1941), replaced by Stavka representative role
 Chief command of the troops of the North Caucasus Direction (1941–42). Stavka ordered the creation of this command on 21 April 1942, and it included the Crimean Front; the Sevastopol' defensive area; the North Caucasus Military District; the Black Sea Fleet; the Azov Flotilla, two rifle divisions, two rifle brigades, and a cavalry corps of four cavalry divisions. Marshal Semyon Budyonny was appointed as the commander-in-chief. On 19 May 1942 the Stavka dissolved both the North Caucasus High Command and the Crimean Front, and a North Caucasus Front was formed in their place.
 Chief command of the troops of the South Western Direction (1941–42), replaced by Stavka representative role
 Central Headquarters of the Partisan Movement (1942–45). A GKO order for the creation of the Central Headquarters [literally Staff] of the Partisan Movement (TsShPD) was issued on 30 May 1942. Hill identifies it as a Party rather than military organisation.
 Chief command of the Soviet troops in the Far East (1945)
 From 1979, new headquarters in the theatres of military operations were established:
 In their most modern form, High Commands for the TVDs were first reestablished in February 1979 for the Far East. Harrison wrote in the 2020s that the new command encompassed the Far East Military District and the Transbaikal Military District. An official military encyclopedia published after the Fall of the Soviet Union stated, said Harrison, that the Soviet Pacific Fleet, an air army, and an air defence corps were also operationally subordinated to the new formation; and that the high command "coordinated" with the armies of Vietnam, Laos, Cambodia, and Mongolia. The headquarters was set up at Ulan-Ude, near Lake Baikal. The RAND Corporation said in 1984 that the Soviet air and ground forces in Mongolia [subordinate to the Transbaikal Military District] and elements of the Mongolian Ground Forces and Mongolian Air Force were also at its disposal.
 In September 1984 three more High Commands were established: the Western (HQ Legnica, Military Unit Number 30172) and South-Western (HQ Kishinev), and Southern (HQ Baku). The experience of creating the main commands of the troops of directorates during the Great Patriotic War, when their improvised creation, as a rule, did not improve, and often worsened the leadership of the troops, was critically considered. The main task was to create a workable control system both in peacetime and in wartime. Despite the widespread reporting that the new High Commands would control both Soviet and allied forces, in a 1993 article Colonel General M.N. Tereschenko (:ru:Терещенко, Михаил Никитович), chief of staff and first deputy commander-in-chief of the Western High Command 1984-88, wrote that that the Western High Command was "only for Soviet forces." The new system was tested in the course of the Soyuz-83 operational-strategic exercises, when for the first time the headquarters of the main command in the Western theater of operations was expanded to its full staff. On 1 July 1991 the Western High Command moved to Smolensk. General of the Army Yury Maksimov (general) (:ru:Максимов, Юрий Павлович) was appointed Commander-in-Chief of the Forces of the Southern High Command from September 1984 to July 1985. The Southern Direction's forces in total included the North Caucasus, Transcaucasus, and Turkestan MDs, five armies, five army corps (12th, 31st, 34th, 36th, and 42nd), the Caspian Flotilla, and the 12th and 19th Armies of the Soviet Air Defence Forces. Army General Mikhail Zaitsev was commander-in-chief of the Southern High Command from 1985-89, by which time he was thus supervising the Limited Contingent of Soviet Forces in Afghanistan (40th Army; air forces; forces of the Rear Services and special troops; and Border and KGB forces) as well.
 In 1986 the U.S. Department of Defense's Soviet Military Power identified ten continental and four oceanic TVDs, possibly better translated in modern terms as Theatres of Strategic Military Action. However most were merely geographical areas without forces or headquarters: North American, South American, African, Australian, Antarctic, Arctic Ocean, Atlantic, Indian Ocean, and Pacific. Four others - the Far Eastern, Western, South-Western, and Southern, had identified headquarters established in 1979 and 1984. Plans appears to have existed to form a Northwestern TVD headquarters on the basis of the Staff of the Leningrad Military District.

 Military districts, within the Soviet Union, came under the direct control of the Ministry of Defence. They served "primarily to train and mobilize troops so as to ensure a high level of combat readiness. Forces within 13 of the 16 districts [had] probably been designated for wartime service under one of the four existing TVD headquarters or a fifth that might be added in wartime. Forces in the Moscow, Volga and Urals Military Districts apparently form the wartime Central Reserve." If war had broken out, the most combat-ready formations within any MD would conduct operations in adjacent theatres under the direction of the appropriate TVD headquarters, while the MD itself would continue to form, equip, and train new military formations for subsequent service abroad while also maintaining domestic political and economic order and conducting local defence.
 group of forces (in Eastern Europe).  These peacetime administrative units would provide support to between one and six fronts during wartime. Groups of forces in Eastern Europe included the Central Group of Forces (Czechoslovakia), the Group of Soviet Forces in Germany, the Northern Group of Forces (Poland), and the Southern Group of Forces (Balkans initially, then Hungary).
 Front: the largest wartime field formation, equivalent to an army group in many other forces. The Imperial Russian Army designated "fronts" in World War I; the Soviets used the concept from the Russian Civil War of 1917-1922 onwards. A frontal Air Army was "ordinarily assigned to each Front (Army Group) of the ground forces, to provide cover, support, interdiction, and reconnaissance for the appropriate sector of the front. In peacetime, those military districts designated for activation, as fronts in wartime are generally each assigned a tactical air army." 
 Army: the largest peacetime field formation. Each army was designated a combined arms army or a tank army. During World War II, the Fortified Region usually corresponded to an Army frontage formation. See Karelian Fortified Region and Kiev Fortified Region.
 Corps: Rifle, Cavalry, Artillery, Mechanised, Tank, and Airborne Corps. There were also corps as part of the Soviet Air Forces and the Soviet Air Defence Forces. The 64th Fighter Aviation Corps was formed to fight in the Korean War, 1950-53.
 Rifle Corps: formations that existed in the pre-Revolutionary Imperial Russian Army were inherited by the Red Army. 
 The formation of large mechanised or tank formations in the Soviet Union was first suggested based on development of doctrine for publication as PU-36, the field regulations of 1936, largely authored by Marshal Mikhail Tukhachevsky. The Red Army put the concept into practice where "In the attack tanks must be employed in mass", envisaged as "Strategic cavalry". Although the name of "mechanised" may seem to the modern reader as referring to the infantry components of the Corps, in 1936 the term referred to armoured vehicles only with the word "motorised" referring to the units equipped with trucks.
 Division: originally rifle or cavalry, later motor-rifle, tank, artillery, aviation, sapper or airborne.  See divisions of the Soviet Union 1917-1945, list of Soviet Army divisions 1989-91. By the middle of the 1980s the Ground Forces contained about 210 manoeuvre divisions. About three-quarters were motor rifle divisions and the remainder tank divisions.

Administrative groupings 
  Cavalry;
  Artillery (see Russian Missile Troops and Artillery, including artillery observation units);
 Air Defence of the Ground Forces (see Air Defence Troops of the Russian Ground Forces and :ru:Войска противовоздушной обороны Сухопутных войск СССР); 
 Engineer Troops (Soviet Union)
 Soviet Army Signal Corps
 army map and military survey; army propaganda troops; Chemical troops; fortification engineers and fortification signals; military academies; medical troops; military field police; military justice units; mobilisation processing personnel (including Voenkomats,Military_commissariats); mortar battalions (MRL); motor maintenance troops; military reconnaissance; smoke troops; specialist officers; 
Rear services (logistics), including a variety of Specialised Troops (:ru:Специальные войска); Automotive Troops, which provided drivers and mechanices, and the construction components, including the Railway Troops (see Russian Railway Troops and including armoured trains); the Road Troops (:ru:Дорожные войска); and the Pipeline Troops; plus army dogs and veterinary troops.
 others

See also 
 :ru:Главные_командования_войск_направлений - High Command of Forces

Notes

References 
 
 Fomin, N. N., Great Soviet Encyclopaedia, Moscow, 1978
 
 
 
 
 
 
 The Soviet Army: Troops, Organization, and Equipment. FM 100-2-3, June 1991. Washington, D.C.: United States Department of the Army.

  For sale by the Supt. of Docs., U.S. G.P.O.

Further reading
 Michael MccGwire, Military Objectives in Soviet Foreign Policy. Washington, D.C.: Brookings Institution Press, 1987. .

Army units and formations of the Soviet Union
Soviet Army